is a junction railway station in the town of Shibata, Miyagi Prefecture, Japan, jointly operated by East Japan Railway Company (JR East) and the third-sector AbukumaExpress.

Lines

Station layout
The station has two opposed side platforms connected to the station building by a footbridge. The station has a Midori no Madoguchi staffed ticket office.

Platforms

History
Tsukinoki Station opened on 12 January 1891. The station was absorbed into the JR East network upon the privatization of the Japanese National Railways (JNR) on 1 April 1987. A new station building was completed in June 1998.

Passenger statistics
In fiscal 2018, the JR East portion of the station was used by an average of 2,843 passengers daily (boarding passengers only). The Abukuma Express portion of the station was used by an average of 1,195 passengers daily in FY2015.

Surrounding area

 Tsukinoki Post Office

See also
 List of Railway Stations in Japan

References

External links

  

Railway stations in Miyagi Prefecture
Tōhoku Main Line
Abukuma Express Line
Railway stations in Japan opened in 1891
Shibata, Miyagi